Riverfront Towers is an apartment and condominium complex of three high rise residential skyscrapers along the International Riverfront in Detroit, Michigan, United States. Each Riverfront Tower creates an ascending tier of three towers.

Buildings
The three buildings are examples of modern architecture. Towers one and two are apartments, Tower three contains condominiums.
 Riverfront Tower 100 is a 275 unit high rise at 100 Riverfront Drive, built in 1991 and finished in 1992.
 Riverfront Tower 200 is a 280 unit high rise at 200 Riverfront Drive, built in 1982 and finished in 1983.
 Riverfront Tower 300 is a 295 unit high rise at 300 Riverfront Drive, built in 1982 and finished in 1983.

Amenities
The towers include a large pool and a fitness center.

Education
The Riverfront Towers properties are zoned for school attendance in the Detroit Public Schools, the Owen Academy at Pelham (K–8), and King High School.

Health and safety concerns
On January 8, 2018, a pipe burst on the 6th floor of Riverfront Towers at Building 100. The alarms went off at 6 a.m. On September 10, 2018, at around 8:00 PM, power to building 200 was lost. The building was evacuated under emergency conditions. The fire department arrived to verify why the fire alarm went off and determined it was due to loss of power to the building. For the next few days, building 200 did not have running water. The Riverfront management worked to get a temporary generator unit in to have basic power supplied to building 200.

On February 8, 2019, there was a pipe burst that flooded 22 apartments in building 200 of Riverfront towers. According to the Detroit Free Press, there was "no expect completion date for repairs and renovations to the apartment."

Notable residents
'Queen of Soul' Aretha Franklin lived, and died, in an apartment in the towers in August 2018.
‘Mother of Civil rights movement’ Rosa Parks lived, and died in her apartment as well in October 2005.
Former Detroit Mayor Coleman A. Young
Nancy Kerrigan  lived here, to be close to her training location Cobo Arena, was her residences during the infamous 1994 Assault  
Christoper Paul Curtis Newbery Medal Award winning author of Bud, Not Buddy and The Watsons Go to Birmingham – 1963.

Gallery

See also
 Alden Park Towers
 International Riverfront

Notes

References

External links
 Riverfront Towers Apartments – official Website
  Luxury Penthouse & $5 Million Renovation of Riverfront Towers Apartments – Michigan Business  (MLive)  July 11, 2013
 

Residential skyscrapers in Detroit
Detroit River
1983 establishments in Michigan
Residential buildings completed in 1983